Freeman Thomas, car designer.

Similar name
Freeman Thomas (cricketer, born 1838), father of
Freeman Freeman-Thomas, 1st Marquess of Willingdon, British politician and Viceroy of India
Marie Freeman-Thomas, Marchioness of Willingdon